John Loftus, 2nd Marquess of Ely KP (15 February 1770 – 26 September 1845), styled The Honourable John Loftus from 1785 to 1794 and Viscount Loftus from 1794 to 1806, was a British peer in both the Irish and British peerages.

Life
He was the son of Charles Loftus, 1st Marquess of Ely and Jane Myhill. Loftus sat in the Irish House of Commons for Wexford County from 1790 until the Act of Union in 1801. He then represented County Wexford in the Parliament of the United Kingdom until 1806, when he succeeded his father as 2nd Marquess of Ely and 2nd Baron Loftus. He was Governor of County Wexford from 1805 and Custos Rotulorum of County Wexford from 1824.

On 3 November 1807, he was appointed a Knight of the Order of St Patrick. From 1800 to 1806, he was a Lord of the Treasury for Ireland.

Family

Loftus married Anna Maria, the daughter of Sir Henry Watkin Dashwood, 3rd Baronet, on 22 May 1810 at St George's Hanover Square, and with her, he had five sons and four daughters, including the cricketer Lord Henry Loftus.

References

External links
 

1770 births
1845 deaths
Loftus, John Loftus, Viscount
Loftus, John Loftus, Viscount
Knights of St Patrick
Loftus, John Loftus, Viscount
Loftus, John Loftus, Viscount
Loftus, John Loftus, Viscount
Loftus, John Loftus, Viscount
UK MPs who inherited peerages
Members of the Privy Council of Ireland
John
Commissioners of the Treasury for Ireland
Marquesses of Ely
18th-century Anglo-Irish people
19th-century Anglo-Irish people